John Julius Cooper, 2nd Viscount Norwich,  (15 September 1929 – 1 June 2018), known as John Julius Norwich, was an English popular historian, travel writer, and television personality.

Background
Norwich was born at the Alfred House Nursing Home on Portland Place in Marylebone, London, on 15 September 1929. He was the son of the Conservative politician and diplomat Duff Cooper, later Viscount Norwich, and of Lady Diana Manners, a celebrated beauty and society figure. He was given the name "Julius" in part because he was born by caesarean section. Such was his mother's fame as an actress and beauty that the birth attracted a crowd outside the nursing home and hundreds of letters of congratulations. Through his father, he was descended from King William IV and his mistress Dorothea Jordan.

He was educated at Egerton House School in Dorset Square, London, later becoming a boarder at the school when it was evacuated to Northamptonshire before the outbreak of the Second World War. Because his father as Minister of Information was high on the Nazi enemies list of British politicians, Norwich's parents feared for their son's safety in the event of a German invasion of Britain. In 1940 they decided to send him away after the US ambassador to Britain, Joseph P. Kennedy, offered to bring him to the United States with other evacuee children on board the SS Washington. He attended Upper Canada College, Toronto, Canada, while spending his holidays with the family of William S. Paley on Long Island in New York. In 1942 he returned to Britain, where he attended Eton College. After the war, he studied at the University of Strasbourg while his father was ambassador to France. He completed his national service in the Royal Navy before taking a degree in French and Russian at New College, Oxford.

Career
Joining the British Foreign Service after Oxford, John Julius Cooper served in Yugoslavia and Lebanon and as a member of the British delegation to the Disarmament Conference in Geneva. On his father's death in 1954, he inherited the title of Viscount Norwich, created for his father, Duff Cooper, in 1952. This gave him a right to sit in the House of Lords, though he lost this right with the House of Lords Act 1999.

In 1964, Norwich left the diplomatic service to become a writer. His subsequent books included histories of Sicily under the Normans (1967, 1970), Venice (1977, 1981), the Byzantine Empire (1988, 1992, 1995), the Mediterranean (2006) and the Papacy (2011), amongst others (see list below). He also served as editor of series such as Great Architecture of the World, The Italian World, The New Shell Guides to Great Britain, The Oxford Illustrated Encyclopaedia of Art and the Duff Cooper Diaries.

Norwich worked extensively in radio and television. He was host of the BBC radio panel game My Word! for four years (1978–82) and also a regional contestant on Round Britain Quiz. He wrote and presented some 30 television documentaries, including The Fall of Constantinople, Napoleon's Hundred Days, Cortés and Montezuma, The Antiquities of Turkey, The Gates of Asia, Maximilian of Mexico, Toussaint l'Ouverture of Haiti, The Knights of Malta, Treasure Houses of Britain, and The Death of the Prince Imperial in the Zulu War.

Norwich also worked for various charitable projects. He was the chairman of the Venice in Peril Fund, honorary chairman of the World Monuments Fund, a member of the General Committee of Save Venice, and a vice-president of the National Association of Decorative and Fine Arts Societies. For many years he was a member of the Executive Committee of the National Trust, and also served on the board of the English National Opera. Norwich was also a patron of SHARE Community, which provides vocational training to disabled people.

Christmas Crackers
Christmas Crackers were compiled from whatever attracted Norwich: letters and diaries and gravestones and poems, boastful Who's Who entries, indexes from biographies, word games such as palindromes, holorhymes and mnemonics, occasionally in untranslated Greek, French, Latin, German or whatever language they were sourced from, as well as such oddities as a review from the American outdoors magazine Field and Stream concerning the republication of Lady Chatterley's Lover.

His final Christmas Cracker was the 49th. It was put together during the early part of 2018 and he corrected the final proofs from his hospital bed before he died on 1 June 2018.

Personal life and death
Norwich's first wife was Anne Frances May Clifford, daughter of the Hon. Sir Bede Clifford; they had one daughter, the Hon. Artemis Cooper, a historian, and a son, the Hon. Jason Charles Duff Bede Cooper, an architect. After their divorce, Norwich married his second wife, the Hon. Mary (Makins) Philipps, daughter of The 1st Baron Sherfield.

Norwich was also the father of Allegra Huston, born of his affair with the American ballet dancer Enrica Soma while she was married to the American film director John Huston.

Norwich lived for much of his life in a large detached Victorian house in Warwick Avenue, in the heart of Little Venice in Maida Vale, London, very close to Regent's Canal.
Norwich died aged 88 on 1 June 2018.

Titles, styles, honours and arms
1929–1952: John Julius Cooper
1952–1954: The Honourable John Julius Cooper
1954–2018: The Right Honourable The Viscount Norwich

Norwich was appointed to the Royal Victorian Order as a Commander in 1992 by Elizabeth II, as part of the celebrations to mark the 40th anniversary of her accession.

Ancestry

Works
Mount Athos (jointly with Reresby Sitwell), Hutchinson, 1966
The Normans in the South, 1016–1130, Longman, 1967. Also published by Harper & Row with the title The Other Conquest
Sahara, Longman, 1968
The Kingdom in the Sun, 1130–1194, Longman, 1970. 
Great Architecture of the World, Littlehampton Book Services Ltd, 1975 
Venice: The Rise to Empire, Allen Lane, 1977 
Venice: The Greatness and Fall, Allen Lane, 1981 
A History of Venice, Knopf, 1982 / Penguin, 1983 , single-volume combined edition
Britain's Heritage (editor), HarperCollins, 1983 
The Italian World: History, Art and the Genius of a People (editor), Thames & Hudson, 1983, 
Hashish (photographs by Suomi La Valle, historical profile by John Julius Norwich), Quartet Books, 1984, 
The Architecture of Southern England, Macmillan, 1985, 
Fifty Years of Glyndebourne, Cape, 1985, 
A Taste for Travel, Macmillan, 1985, 
Byzantium: The Early Centuries, Viking, 1988, 
Venice: a Traveller's Companion (an anthology compiled by Lord Norwich), Constable, 1990, 
Oxford Illustrated Encyclopaedia of Art (editor) Oxford, 1990
The Normans in the South and The Kingdom in the Sun, on Norman Sicily, later republished as The Normans in Sicily, Penguin, 1992 (The Normans in the South, 1016–1130; originally published:- Harlow:Longman,1967—The Kingdom in the Sun, 1130–1194; originally published:- Harlow:Longman, 1970) 
Byzantium; v. 2: The Apogee, Alfred A. Knopf, 1992, 
Byzantium; v. 3: The Decline and Fall, Viking, 1995, 
A Short History of Byzantium, Alfred A. Knopf, 1997, 
The Twelve Days of Christmas (Correspondence) (illustrated by Quentin Blake), Doubleday, 1998 (spoof of the old favourite carol, "The Twelve Days of Christmas"), 
Shakespeare's Kings: the Great Plays and the History of England in the Middle Ages: 1337–1485, New York: Scribner, 2000, 
Treasures of Britain (editor), Everyman Publishers, 2002, 
Paradise of Cities, Venice and its Nineteenth-century Visitors, Viking/Penguin, 2003, 
The Duff Cooper Diaries (editor), Weidenfeld & Nicolson, 2006, 
The Middle Sea: A History of the Mediterranean, Doubleday, 2006, 
Trying to Please (autobiography), Wimborne Minster, Dovecote Press, 2008, 
Christmas Crackers (anecdotes, trivia and witticisms collected from history and literature)
More Christmas Crackers
The Big Bang: Christmas Crackers, 2000–2009, Dovecote Press, 2010, 
The Great Cities in History (editor), Thames and Hudson, 2009, 
Absolute Monarchs: A History of the Papacy, Random House, 2011,  (US title for The Popes: A History)
The Popes: A History, Chatto & Windus, 2011,  (UK title for Absolute Monarchs: A History of the Papacy)
A History of England in 100 Places: From Stonehenge to the Gherkin, John Murray, 2012, 
Darling Monster: The Letters of Lady Diana Cooper to Her Son John Julius Norwich (editor), Chatto & Windus, 2013, 
Cities That Shaped the Ancient World (editor), Thames and Hudson Ltd, 2014, 
Sicily: An Island at the Crossroads of History, Random House, 2015, 
Four Princes: Henry VIII, Francis I, Charles V, Suleiman the Magnificent and the Obsessions that Forged Modern Europe, John Murray, 2016, 
France: A History: from Gaul to de Gaulle, John Murray, 2018, 
A History of France, Atlantic Monthly Press, 2018, 
A Christmas Cracker being a commonplace selection, 2018,

References

Sources
 Leaders & Legends: John Julius Norwich (In: Old Times; Winter/Spring, 2008)

External links

Penguin books short biography

1929 births
2018 deaths
British expatriates in France
English expatriates in Canada
English travel writers
English radio personalities
English television personalities
Fellows of the Society of Antiquaries of London
Alumni of New College, Oxford
People educated at Eton College
Upper Canada College alumni
Commanders of the Royal Victorian Order
Viscounts in the Peerage of the United Kingdom
Fellows of the Royal Society of Literature
British Byzantinists
21st-century British writers
20th-century English historians
21st-century British historians
Historians of the Mediterranean
Historians of Sicily
English male non-fiction writers
British writers
Scholars of Byzantine history
Norwich